The 1998 Colgate Red Raiders football team was an American football team that represented Colgate University during the 1998 NCAA Division I-AA football season. A year after winning the conference championship, Colgate finished second in the Patriot League. 

In its third season under head coach Dick Biddle, the team compiled an 8–4 record. Corey Hill and Luke George were the team captains. 

The Red Raiders outscored opponents 419 to 328. Their 5–1 conference record placed second in the seven-team Patriot League standings. 

Though Colgate failed to repeat as Patriot League champion, the Red Raiders did qualify for the Division I-AA playoffs for the second year in a row. Colgate lost in the first round of the national tournament, to No. 2 Georgia Southern. Unranked throughout the regular season, Colgate was No. 21 in the final national poll.

The team played its home games at Andy Kerr Stadium in Hamilton, New York.

Schedule

References

Colgate
Colgate Raiders football seasons
Colgate Red Raiders football